A convertible is a class of automobiles with an optional open roof top

Convertible may also refer to:

Convertible (computer), a class of computers between tablet PCs and notebooks
Convertible currency, a currency reference
Convertible security, a stock trading reference
IBM PC Convertible, IBM's first laptop computer in 1986
Convertibles (album), an album by Chuck Inglish

See also
Cabriolet, a French term for convertible
Cabriolet (carriage), a light two-wheeled horse-drawn vehicle
Cabriolet (furniture), an armchair
Netvertible, a class of computers between tablets and netbooks